Roy Lane Marble, Jr. (December 13, 1966 – September 11, 2015) was an American professional basketball player, 6'6" tall, who played as a swingman (shooting guard/small forward).

After playing four seasons at the University of Iowa from 1985 to 1989, Marble left the college as Iowa's all-time leading scorer with 2,116 points, a record which stood for 32 years until Luka Garza broke it on February 21, 2021. Marble was selected by the Atlanta Hawks in the first round (23rd overall) of the 1989 NBA Draft, playing for the club during his rookie year (24 games, scoring a total of 51 points).

He also had a brief stint with the Denver Nuggets during the 1993–94 season, appearing in 5 games.

Personal life
In August 2014, Marble was diagnosed with stage 4 cancer that began in his lungs. He was publicly vocal about his struggle with this terminal disease, while relocating his family from Iowa to his home state of Michigan. 

Marble died of cancer on September 11, 2015 at the age of 48.

Marble's son, Devyn, followed in his father's footsteps to Iowa and the NBA. Devyn and his father were the first father-son duo in Big Ten history to each score 1,000 points.

Marble came into the news again in 2021 when his family expressed displeasure at the retirement of Luka Garza's jersey number (announced after the last game of the season on March 7), noting that they felt hurt and disrespected by the move upon the fact that Marble's number was not retired; Marble, alongside Murray Wier and Chuck Darling, are considered the best players to not have their jersey number retired by Iowa. Devyn stated that he would never publicly watch another Iowa game again. Two days after announcing Garza's jersey retirement, Iowa athletic director Gary Barta gave a public apology to the Marble family.

References

External links
Stats at Basketball-Reference

1966 births
2015 deaths
American expatriate basketball people in Canada
American men's basketball players
Atlanta Hawks draft picks
Atlanta Hawks players
Basketball players from Flint, Michigan
Deaths from cancer in Michigan
Cedar Rapids Silver Bullets players
Denver Nuggets players
Fargo-Moorhead Fever players
Iowa Hawkeyes men's basketball players
McDonald's High School All-Americans
Parade High School All-Americans (boys' basketball)
Quad City Thunder players
Shooting guards
Shreveport Crawdads players
Small forwards
Tri-City Chinook players